John E. "Dropkick" Murphy (May 12, 1912 in Malden, Massachusetts – October 17, 1977 in Concord, Massachusetts) was an American professional wrestler and sanatorium owner. He operated the Bellows Farms Sanatorium, an alcoholic rehabilitation facility in Acton, Massachusetts from 1941 to 1971. The band Dropkick Murphys is named after him.

Wrestling career

Murphy was a Doctor of Osteopathic Medicine, having graduated from the Massachusetts College of Osteopathy, but he never practiced. Instead, he was a professional wrestler in the 1930s and 1940s, mostly competing in the Northeastern United States, sometimes billed as "Dr. John (Dropkick) Murphy". Murphy competed in matches, some promoted by Paul Bowser and Jack Pfefer, at places and venues including Portland, Maine, the Boston Arena and Mechanics Hall in Boston, Massachusetts, The Mosque (a roller rink) in Bridgeport, Connecticut, the Rex Arena in Lowell, Massachusetts, the Philadelphia Arena, the Convention Hall on Line Street in Camden, New Jersey,  the Grand Olympic Auditorium in Los Angeles, the Montreal Forum, the Opera House in Newark, New Jersey, the Ridgewood Grove Sports Center in Ridgewood, Queens, New York City, the Fort Hamilton Arena in Brooklyn, New York City and St. Nicholas Palace (also called the Royal Windsor Palace) and Hippodrome, in Manhattan, New York City.

Sanatorium

Murphy, with his wife Marie (and after her death, his second wife Jean) owned a farmhouse at 42 Davis Road in north Acton, Massachusetts and adjoining property, near the intersection of Great Road (route 2A) and Main Street (route 27). Filling a need that Murphy saw, the facility was turned into a rehabilitation center for alcoholics to "dry out" (as the alcohol detoxification process was informally called during those times). The name of the facility was the Bellows Farm Sanatorium, but it was almost universally called Dropkick Murphy's.

In America in the middle of the twentieth century, alcoholism was more often considered a character flaw and shameful secret rather than a disease (the American Medical Association declared alcoholism to be a disease only in 1956, for instance). In recognition of this, Murphy's client list was kept private, and a comprehensive list of clients is probably lost to history. But long before facilities such as the Betty Ford Clinic made celebrity rehabilitation more public and acceptable, the Bellows Farm Sanatorium treated clients including, according to rumor and legend, celebrities from the sporting and entertainment worlds of Boston and further afield, such as Jackie Gleason.
Popular Boston newspaper columnist Howie Carr would occasionally reference Dropkick Murphy's sanatorium, sometimes in jeering reference to the Kennedy family, a particular bête noire and hobbyhorse of Carr's.

The facility closed in 1971, Murphy died in 1977, and the sanatorium farmhouse has been converted to professional offices Some of the land around the sanatorium's former location has been developed into the Briarbrook Village Apartments and other properties. Nashoba Brook runs through the property, the Nashoba Brook–Spring Hill–Camp Acton conservation areas are adjacent, and the Acton portion of the Bay Circuit hiking trail runs nearby.

The popular Boston punk band Dropkick Murphys, formed in 1996, were named after Murphy and his sanatorium. None of the band's past or current members have any connection to Murphy; the name was chosen because founder and frontman Ken Casey liked the sound of it.

References

1912 births
1977 deaths
Sportspeople from Malden, Massachusetts
People from Acton, Massachusetts
Sportspeople from Middlesex County, Massachusetts
Professional wrestlers from Massachusetts
American hospital administrators